Skeletons in the Closet is a compilation album by the Finnish melodic death metal band Children of Bodom, released on 22 September 2009 through Spinefarm Records. The album only contains four unreleased covers for the songs "Hell Is for Children", "Antisocial", "War Inside My Head", and "Waiting", but the previously released songs are remixed and new details can be heard.
The Japanese edition is pressed in SHM-CD format.

Track listing

European version

US version

Japanese version

Charts

Personnel
Children of Bodom
Alexi Laiho − lead guitar, lead vocals
Roope Latvala − rhythm guitar, backing vocals
Janne Wirman − keyboards
Henkka Seppälä − bass, backing vocals
Jaska Raatikainen − drums
Alexander Kuoppala − rhythm guitar and backing vocals on "Mass Hypnosis", "Hellion", "No Commands", "Don't Stop at the Top", "Silent Scream", "Aces High", "Somebody Put Something in My Drink", "Rebel Yell" and "Waiting"

Guest musicians
Nipa Ryti – bass on "Don't Stop at the Top" and "Waiting"
Euge Valovirta – banjo on "Lookin' Out My Back Door"
Pete Salomaa – upright bass on "Lookin' Out My Back Door"
Kaapro Ikonen – vocals on "No Commands"
Mikko Karmila – guitar solo on "War Inside My Head"
Jonna Kosonen – vocals on "Oops!... I Did It Again"
Band photos by Tomi Lauren
Artwork and layout by Kalle Pyyhtinen

References

 Details at Metal Underground
 Alexander Kuoppala Tracks

2009 compilation albums
Covers albums
Children of Bodom albums